Jim Foat (born 21 November 1952) is a former English cricketer. He played for Gloucestershire between 1972 and 1979.

Foat has a cult following.

References

External links

1952 births
Living people
English cricketers
Gloucestershire cricketers
People from Warwickshire